Oae may refer to:
Oae (Attica), a deme of ancient Attica
Marius Oae (born 1983), Romanian footballer

See also
OAE (disambiguation)